Jenny Brine is a former women’s ice hockey player. Having played at the NCAA level with the Harvard Crimson women's ice hockey program, she was also a member of the Toronto Furies from 2010-13. Brine would also appear with the Canada women's national ball hockey team at three ISBHF World Championships.

Playing career

CWHL
During the 2012-13 CWHL season, Brine and her Furies teammates participated in the first regular season game to be contested in an NHL arena. Hosted at Toronto’s Air Canada Centre on November 17, 2012, the Furies competed against Team Alberta. During the second period, Brine would score a goal as Wakefield and Alexandra Hoffmeyer both gained assists.

The last goal of her CWHL career took place on November 24, 2012 against the Montreal Stars. Scoring in the second period, Rebecca Johnston was credited with the assist. Brine’s final point in CWHL play took place on January 12, 2013 against the Brampton Thunder. Along with Johnston, the two earned the assist on a goal scored by Jennifer Wakefield during the third period.

Ball hockey
Brine was among the members of the Canadian national women’s team that captured the gold medal on home soil at the 2013 ISBHF World Street Hockey Championships in St. John’s, Newfoundland, Canada. Of note, she was one of four CWHL players named to the 2013 roster, including Chelsea Purcell of Team Alberta, Mallory Johnston of the Brampton Thunder, and her Furies teammate Britni Smith.

Career stats

Awards and honours
 Honourable Mention All-Ivy League, 2007–08, Forward, Harvard (Junior)
 2009 Third Team All-ECAC
 2015 CBHA Nationals, Tournament Most Valuable Player
 2015 CBHA Nationals, All-Star Team Selection

References

Living people
Toronto Furies players
Harvard Crimson women's ice hockey players
Canadian women's ice hockey forwards
1987 births